Myrocarpus is a genus of flowering plants in the family Fabaceae. It contains the following species:
 Myrocarpus fastigiatus Allemão
 Myrocarpus frondosus Allemão
 Myrocarpus leprosus Pickel

 Myrocarpus venezuelensis Rudd
Members of this genus produce hydroxypipecolic acids in their leaves.

References

Amburaneae
Fabaceae genera
Taxonomy articles created by Polbot